Alamu Atatalo was a pioneer of sekere, a type of traditional Yoruba music. A native of Ibadan, he was popular in Yorubaland throughout the 1950s and early 1960s. By the middle of the 1960s, however, his popularity began to wane when he was incriminated, in a criminal frame-up, by his detractors. As a result, he struggled relentlessly, for more than a decade, to clear his name. Ultimately, he bounced back and reclaimed his position as the "king of sekere" in the mid-70s by releasing several hit LP records. His version of sekere music and Alhaji Dauda Epo-Akara's were music dominated the Ibadan party scenes until the advent of Alhaji Sikiru Ayinde Barrister's fuji music.

Yoruba musicians
Nigerian male musicians
Year of birth missing
Year of death missing
Musicians from Ibadan